Britt Bager (born 16 August 1976 in Grenaa) is a Danish politician, who is a member of the Folketing for the Conservative People's Party political party. She was elected into the Folketing in the 2015 Danish general election for the Venstre political party, but switched to the Conservative People's Party in 2021.

Political career
Bager first ran in the 2015 election, where she was elected after receiving 7,306 personal votes. She was reelected in the 2019 election with 10,490 votes cast for her.

In 2021 she left Venstre to join the Conservative People's Party.

References

External links 
 Biography on the website of the Danish Parliament (Folketinget)

Living people
1976 births
People from Norddjurs Municipality
21st-century Danish women politicians
Women members of the Folketing
Venstre (Denmark) politicians
Conservative People's Party (Denmark) politicians
Members of the Folketing 2015–2019
Members of the Folketing 2019–2022